Caucasopisthes is a monotypic genus of Asian dwarf spiders containing the single species, Caucasopisthes procurvus. It was first described by A. V. Tanasevitch in 1990, and has only been found in Georgia and Russia.

See also
 List of Linyphiidae species

References

Linyphiidae
Monotypic Araneomorphae genera
Spiders of Asia